The 1895 West Virginia Mountaineers football team was an American football team that represented West Virginia University as an independent during the 1895 college football season. In its first and only season under head coach Harry McCrory, the team compiled a 5–1 record and outscored opponents by a combined total of 58 to 10. The team's sole loss was to Washington & Jefferson by a 4–0 score. William J. Bruner was the team captain.

Schedule

References

West Virginia
West Virginia Mountaineers football seasons
West Virginia Mountaineers football